The 2015–16 Scottish Youth Cup is the 33rd season of the Scottish Youth Cup, the national knockout tournament at youth level organised by the Scottish Football Association for its full and associate member clubs. The tournament was for the under-20 age group, to complement current youth development strategies, having formerly been an under-19 competition. Players born after 1 January 1996 are eligible to play.

Calendar

Format
The sixteen clubs who reached the fourth round of the 2014–15 competition receive a bye to the third round of this season's tournament. The remaining thirty-eight clubs enter the first round and are initially divided into three regional groups to reduce travelling. The tournament becomes an all-in national competition from the third round onwards.

First round
The draw for the first and second rounds took place on 15 August 2015.

Central Group

Three ties was drawn in this group with the following clubs receiving a bye to the second round:

Airdrieonians
Alloa Athletic
BSC Glasgow
Civil Service Strollers
Dundee
East Stirlingshire
Falkirk
Heriot Watt University 
Lothian Thistle Hutchinson Vale 
Motherwell
Partick Thistle
Spartans
Stenhousemuir
Stirling Albion
Whitehill Welfare

North Group

Two ties were drawn in this group with all the following clubs receiving byes to the second round.
Aberdeen
Banks O'Dee
Clachnacuddin
Deveronvale
Huntly
Inverness Caledonian Thistle
Lossiemouth
Ross County
Turriff United

South Group

One tie were drawn in this group with all the following club receiving a bye to the second round.
Dalbeattie Star

Second round

Central Group

North Group

South Group

Third round
The following sixteen clubs entered at this stage by virtue of having reached the fourth round of last season's competition:

Annan Athletic
Ayr United
Celtic
Dundee United
Dunfermline Athletic
Greenock Morton
Hamilton Academical
Hamilton Academical
Heart of Midlothian
Hibernian
Kilmarnock
Queen of the South
Queen's Park
Rangers
Selkirk
St Johnstone

The third round draw was announced on 22 September 2015.

Fourth round
The fourth round draw was announced on 4 November 2015.

Quarter-finals
The quarter-finals draw was announced on 16 December 2015.

Semi-finals
The ties for the semi finals were played on 6 and 8 March 2016.

Final

External links
Youth Cup on Scottish FA website

References

5
Scottish Youth Cup seasons